Quincy is an unincorporated community in Columbia County, Oregon, United States. It is located about 4.5 miles northeast of Clatskanie and 3.5 miles southwest of Mayger in a drained and diked area of the Columbia River lowlands.

The Quincy area was first settled about 1882 and named by J. W. Barnes for his hometown of Quincy, Illinois. Quincy post office ran from 1892 until 1933.

In 1915, Quincy had a population of 40 and two churches and two schools. In 1940, Quincy had a population of 303. Quincy Store is still in operation.

References

External links
Images of Quincy from Flickr
Images of Quincy Store from Columbia River Images

Unincorporated communities in Columbia County, Oregon
Unincorporated communities in Oregon